The 1977 Southeast Asian Games, officially known as the 9th Southeast Asian Games, was a Southeast Asian multi-sport event held in Kuala Lumpur, Malaysia from 19 to 26 November 1977. This was the third time Malaysia hosted the games and its first since 1971. Previously, it also hosted the games for the first time in 1965. Brunei, Indonesia, and the Philippines were finally admitted into the SEAP Games Federation in February that year. Although the word 'Peninsula' was omitted from the new federation title to reflect the expansion, in which the games is the first games to bear the name, its emblem (which featured six rings representing the six founding members), and the sequential numbering of the games was kept to provide continuity, as well as reverence to the objectives, aspirations and contributions of the founders. The six-ring emblem was not replaced until 1999, when the present ten-ring emblem was first used in an official games logo. The games was opened and closed by Yahya Petra, the King of Malaysia at the Stadium Merdeka. The final medal tally was led by Indonesia, followed by Thailand and the Philippines, with host Malaysia in fifth place.

The games

Participating nations
Brunei was a British protectorate at that time.
The Bold Lines means the Nation makes its debut appearance from the games.

 
 
 
  (Host)

Sports

Medal table

Key

References

External links
 History of the SEA Games

 
Southeast Asian Games
Southeast Asian Games
International sports competitions hosted by Malaysia
Southeast Asian Games, 1977
Multi-sport events in Malaysia
Sport in Kuala Lumpur
Southeast Asian Games
Southeast Asian Games, 1977
Southeast Asian Games